is a former Japanese football player.

Club career

Japan
‘Shin’ as he is known, started his professional career as a 19-year-old for Yokohama F. Marinos when their then manager Osvaldo Ardiles handed him his debut. Shin continued in the team that season, playing against international legends such as Bebeto and helped guide his team to their first League Championship (Stage 1). Shin played alongside Japanese national hero Shunsuke Nakamura, who also started his career at Yokohoma.  In 2002 acquired by Omiya Ardija and then Tokushima Vortis.

He played part of the 2005 season and all of the 2006 season for ALO's Hokuriku of the Japan Football League in Japan.  After successful spells in J.League Shin decided to move abroad in 2007 and entered the open trials for the newly formed Crystal Palace Baltimore in the USL Second Division, arriving with a little bit of English and his boots.

United States

Crystal Palace Baltimore
In his first season in Baltimore, Harada was named to the USL Second Division All-League Second-Team, and followed that up by being named in the USL Second Division All-League First-Team in 2008, 2009, and 2010.

Harada has become USL-2 All-League regular by making his fourth consecutive appearance on an All-League team.  He was also the Most Valuable Defender finalist in 2009, and earned that award in 2010.  He is nominated as 2010 USL Second Division Most Valuable Player.

During the 2008 off-season, several Major League Soccer clubs showed interest in him, and invited to take part in their trials such by Chicago Fire, Real Salt Lake, and San Jose Earthquakes, but due to injury had to return to Palace for the 2009 season.

Following his impressive performances in the 2009 season, Harada went on trial at Baltimore's English parent club, Crystal Palace.

After an unheard 3 months of training with Crystal Palace F.C., he was selected as the "Palace's Other Player Of The Year" on Crystal Palace F.C.'s official club magazine, and featured also on Major League Soccer's expansion team Philadelphia Union's official website as a strong candidate for the club's tryout.

Pittsburgh Riverhounds
On 22 March 2010, the Pittsburgh Riverhounds announced the signing of Harada to a contract for the 2010 season.

While in the second division, Harada won the league's USL Second Division All-League First Team for 4 consecutive years. He re-signed with Pittsburgh, in the USL Pro league, on 21 February 2011.

CE Sabadell FC and Dayton Dutch Lions
After the conclusion of the 2012 season, Harada was invited to tryout with CE Sabadell FC that plays in Spanish Segunda División. Before the USL Pro season started, Harada signed with Dayton Dutch Lions, where he led the club into the playoffs for the first time in club history.

Colorado Springs Switchbacks FC
On 12 February 2015, The Colorado Springs Switchbacks FC announced the signing of Harada for the 2015 season.  This will be Harada's 3rd team in USL PRO.  Head Coach Steve Trittschuh praised that "Harada has been a great leader for us and role model for the younger players".  On June 23, 2015, Harada made his 100th appearance in United Soccer League as the first Japanese in league history. Harada ended his first season with the Colorado Springs Switchbacks FC with 2 goals and 2 assists and logged 2,000 minutes of play time.

On January 12, 2016 it was announced that Harada had resigned for Colorado Springs Switchbacks FC for the 2016 USL Pro season.

Hong Kong
Upon conclusion of USL Pro 2013 season, Harada announced he would sign with Yokohama FC Hong Kong on a loan deal until 31 January 2014.

Retirement

After retiring in 2017, he became a scout for the Japanese J.League side FC Tokyo. In 2019, it was announced that he became the scout for Omiya Ardija, in J.League, where he played as a player back in 2002.

Club statistics

Playing style
Proved as a quality utility player who plays both holding midfielder, and center defender by being selected to All-League First-Team for both positions. Known for his accurate distribution, and play making in the middle as the control tower. Admires the Mexican National Team's Rafael Márquez, and FC Barcelona's Pep Guardiola.

Has been reported about his "the dedicated — almost spartan — approach" with his profession

Honors and awards

Personal
 2015 - First Japanese to appear in 100 games in United Soccer League
 2010 - USL Second Division Most Valuable Player Finalist
 2010 - USL Second Division Most Valuable Defender
 2010 - USL Second Division All-League First Team
 2009 - Crystal Palace F.C.: "Palace's Other Player Of The Year"
 2009 - USL Second Division All-League First-Team
 2009 - USL Second Division Most Valuable Defender Finalist
 2008 - USL Second Division All-League First-Team
 2007 - USL Second Division All-League Second-Team

Team
 2000 - Yokohama F. Marinos - J1 League Stage 1 Champion

References

External links

Pittsburgh Riverhounds player profile
Crystal Palace Baltimore player profile
SOCCER TRANSITION - Made In Japan

1980 births
Living people
Association football people from Saitama Prefecture
Japanese footballers
J1 League players
J2 League players
Japan Football League players
Yokohama F. Marinos players
Omiya Ardija players
Tokushima Vortis players
Kataller Toyama players
Japanese expatriate footballers
USL Second Division players
USL Championship players
Crystal Palace Baltimore players
Pittsburgh Riverhounds SC players
Dayton Dutch Lions players
Colorado Springs Switchbacks FC players
Expatriate soccer players in the United States
Association football midfielders